Sir David Muthiah Devadoss (18 December 1868 – 11 November 1951) was an Indian judge of the Madras High Court who served as a member of the Council of State.

Early life 

Devadoss was born in Palayamcottah on 18 December 1868 to E. Muthiah Pillai. He studied at the C. M. S. High School, Palayamcottah and the Madras Law College and qualified for the bar from the Inner Temple.

Career 

Devadoss enrolled as a vakil of the Madras High Court in 1892 and became a judge in 1921. Upon retirement in 1928, Devadoss was nominated to the Council of State in New Delhi. Devadoss was knighted in the 1932 New Year Honours.

Personal life 

Devadoss married Masilamoney Chellammal, daughter of J.T. Srinivasagen Pillai. Lady Devadoss died in 1948. Sir David Devadoss died in Madras on 11 November 1951, at the age of 82. Their children were Seetha, Muthamma, Vedha, and Muthukrishnan.

References 

 

1868 births
1951 deaths
Knights Bachelor
Judges of the Madras High Court
Members of the Inner Temple
Members of the Council of State (India)